Luciano Marion (22 September 1928 – 1993) was an Italian coxswain. 

Marion was born in 1928 in Koper, which was located in Italy at the time but was assigned to Yugoslavia after World War II. He competed at the 1952 Summer Olympics in Helsinki with the men's coxed pair where they came fourth.

References

1928 births
1993 deaths
Italian male rowers
Olympic rowers of Italy
Rowers at the 1952 Summer Olympics
Sportspeople from Koper
Coxswains (rowing)
European Rowing Championships medalists